Mount Vernon is a city in, and the county seat of, Montgomery County, Georgia, United States. The population was 1,900 at the 2020 census, down from 2,451 in 2010. It is home to Brewton–Parker College.

History
Mount Vernon was founded in 1797. It became the county seat in 1813, replacing the plantation of Arthur Lott. It was incorporated as a town in 1872 and as a city in 1960. The city is named after Mount Vernon, the estate of George Washington.

Geography
Mount Vernon is located on the west side of Montgomery County at  (32.181403, -82.593759). It is bordered to the east by Ailey.

U.S. Routes 221 and 280 intersect just north of the center of town. US 221 leads north  to Soperton and south  to Hazlehurst, while US 280 leads east  to Vidalia and west  to McRae–Helena.

Demographics

Mount Vernon is part of the Vidalia Micropolitan Statistical Area.

2020 census

As of the 2020 United States census, there were 1,990 people, 841 households, and 554 families residing in the city.

2000 census
As of the census of 2000, there were 2,082 people, 704 households, and 461 families residing in the city. The racial makeup of the city was 56.34% White, 41.83% African American, 0.05% Native American, 0.62% Asian, 0.05% Pacific Islander, 0.82% from other races, and 0.29% from two or more races. Hispanic or Latino of any race were 1.59% of the population.

There were 704 households, out of which 35.9% had children under the age of 18 living with them, 42.5% were married couples living together, 19.9% had a female householder with no husband present, and 34.4% were non-families. 28.4% of all households were made up of individuals, and 9.8% had someone living alone who was 65 years of age or older.  The average household size was 2.56 and the average family size was 3.19.

In the city, the population was spread out, with 26.4% under the age of 18, 22.0% from 18 to 24, 25.9% from 25 to 44, 16.9% from 45 to 64, and 8.9% who were 65 years of age or older.  The median age was 26 years. For every 100 females, there were 88.1 males.  For every 100 females age 18 and over, there were 82.9 males.

The median income for a household in the city was $26,466, and the median income for a family was $33,750. Males had a median income of $27,112 versus $19,766 for females. The per capita income for the city was $11,509.  About 18.3% of families and 23.5% of the population were below the poverty line, including 24.5% of those under age 18 and 22.3% of those age 65 or over.

Education

College
Brewton–Parker College is a private, Christian, coeducational college whose main campus is located in Mount Vernon.

Primary and secondary education
The Montgomery County School District holds grades pre-school to grade twelve, and consists of one elementary school, a middle school, and a high school. The district has 83 full-time teachers and over 1,294 students. 
 Montgomery County High School
 Montgomery County Middle School
 Montgomery County Elementary School

Montgomery County High School didn't have an integrated prom until 2010.  The school received national attention in the New York Times for unofficially sponsoring separate, segregated proms for white and black students.  It is one of 178 school districts in the United States with an open, active desegregation order.

Media
 WYUM, 101.7 FM Radio

Infrastructure

Transportation
Highways

Notable people
 John Britton, third baseman in the Negro leagues and the Japanese Pacific League
 Theodore Johnson, member of the Pennsylvania House of Representatives
 Roquan Smith, linebacker for the Baltimore Ravens

See also
 Association of Georgia Klans

References

External links

Cities in Georgia (U.S. state)
Cities in Montgomery County, Georgia
County seats in Georgia (U.S. state)
Vidalia, Georgia, micropolitan area